Jonathan Brooks Lemmon (born December 28, 1984 in Lawrence, Kansas) is an American soccer player.

Although he grew up in Lawrence, KS, Lemmon played high school soccer at Maranatha Academy High School in Shawnee, Kansas, college soccer at MidAmerica Nazarene University, and in the USL for Cleveland City Stars and now with HNK Primorac. He is in the Kansas Sports Hall of Fame, holds the Kansas scoring record with 96 goals and 39 assists in 54 games. He also holds the Maranatha single season scoring record with 39 goals. Selected as an All American and the Heart of America Athletic Conference Offensive Player of the Year in 2008.

Sources
 Heart of America Athletic Conference
 MidAmerica Nazarene University Soccer Roster
 Kansas State Soccer Hall of Fame

External links
 Olathe News Story
 HAAC Offensive Player of the Year
 MidAmerica Player Profile
 MidAmerica Soccer News

1984 births
Living people
American soccer players
American expatriate soccer players
Cleveland City Stars players
Soccer players from Kansas
Sportspeople from Lawrence, Kansas
Association football forwards
Association football midfielders
American expatriate sportspeople in Croatia
Expatriate footballers in Croatia
MidAmerica Nazarene University alumni
College men's soccer players in the United States
USL Second Division players